Ahmed Najah (born 1947) is a Moroccan former footballer. He competed in the men's tournament at the 1972 Summer Olympics.

References

External links
 
 

1947 births
Living people
Moroccan footballers
Morocco international footballers
Olympic footballers of Morocco
Footballers at the 1972 Summer Olympics
1972 African Cup of Nations players
Place of birth missing (living people)
Association football defenders